Albacete (also ,) is a city and municipality in the Spanish autonomous community of Castilla–La Mancha, and capital of the province of Albacete.

Lying in the south-east of the Iberian Peninsula, the area around the city is known as Los Llanos. Halfway between Madrid and the Mediterranean coast, it enjoys connections by motorway, railway (including AVE), and air (Albacete Airport). With a population of 174,336 (2020), it is the largest municipality of Castilla–La Mancha. The municipality of Albacete is also the seventh-largest in Spain by total area, being . Albacete is the seat to the regional High Court of Justice.

The origins of the city are uncertain, with the earliest proof of settlement dating to the time of Al-Andalus, when the settlement was originally named , meaning "The Flat" in Arabic, referring to the flat land around. Albacete was the main headquarters of the International Brigades during the Spanish Civil War

Part of the historic region of La Mancha, Albacete has a reputation as producer of clasp knives. Its flat area and the removal of architectural barriers have reportedly made it one of the most accessible cities across the country.

Among the several festivities celebrated in the city, the September Feria de Albacete stands out, declared as festivity of "International Tourist Interest".

Albacete is home to multinationals and has five large industrial zones, including Campollano, the largest industrial area of Castilla–La Mancha. Albacete houses one of the campus of the University of Castilla–La Mancha, the Biomedical Campus of Albacete and the Technology Park of Albacete.

The aviation industry is one of the main economic engines of the city. Albacete hosts the School of TLP NATO pilots, Los Llanos Air Base, Ala 14 and the Air Maestranza Albacete. In addition, the city houses the Air and Logistic Park of Albacete, home to major companies.

Name 
The name Albacete is derived from the Andalusian name for the area, the city having been originally called  in Arabic, which translates to "the plain" in reference to the plateau that characterizes the geography of the area.

Pascual Madoz in his famous Diccionario geográfico-estadístico-histórico de España y sus posesiones de Ultramar (Geographical-historical-statistical Dictionary of Spain and its overseas territories) indicates that two hypotheses about the toponym of Albacete are probable. In the first place he highlights the proposal suggested by Bernardo Espinalt y Garcia, who believes that the city was founded by the Cilicians, who called it Celtide relying on Liutprand of Cremona, " (in Spain this place is called Celtide, which the Moors called Albacene incorrectly)".

History

The origins of the city are uncertain, although the first few confirmations of its existence are found during the Moorish domination of the area, when it was a small Moorish village. Its name is derived from the Arabic  , "El Llano" ("the plain") referring to the planiform nature of the geography of the area.

In 1240, Albacete capitulated to Ferdinand III, who had support from the Order of Santiago and knights from the land of Alarcón. Soon after, in 1241, in return for help provided, the monarch donated the place to Alarcón. The hamlet of Albacete was transferred from Alarcón to Chinchilla by Alfonso X in 1269.

Albacete was granted the privilege of town (villa) in 1375 by Don Juan Manuel, prince of Villena, becoming independent from Chinchilla. also being granted a fuero in that time. A century later, in 1476, the Catholic Monarchs rewarded Albacete for supporting the Crown by granting it a licence to hold a market once a week.

During the Revolt of the Comuneros (1520–22), after initial protests, Albacete supported the new emperor Charles V who, in 1526, granted the feudal estate of the town to his wife, the Empress Isabella of Portugal. During this period, building started on the church of San Juan Bautista (St John the Baptist), which was later to become a cathedral.

Albacete is located in a strategic position between Madrid and the east coast of Spain and its agricultural wealth led to the growth of the borough during the next few centuries until Philip V granted permission for an annual fair (1710). This fair was later held in an enclosure built by Charles III (1783).

In the early 19th century, in the context of the discussion for the creation of a new province upon territory belonging to New Castile and Murcia, Albacete vied for the capital status of the intended demarcation against nearby Chinchilla. They had a similar population at the time, although Albacete probably had the edge in economic prowess. Chinchilla briefly became head of province during the trienio liberal before the absolutist crackdown of Ferdinand VII, but the definitive 1833 territorial division devised by Javier de Burgos established Albacete as capital of the new province of Albacete.

Soon after, in 1834, an Audiencia Territorial (a regional court) was established in Albacete, exercising jurisdiction over a demarcation comprising the provinces of Ciudad Real, Cuenca, Murcia and Albacete.

Railway reached Albacete on 18 March 1855, as the Alcázar de San Juan–Albacete stretch of the Madrid–Almansa line was opened on that day. Albacete was granted the title of city (ciudad) through a Royal Decree issued in November 1862, during the reign of Isabella II. Following the opening of the Chinchilla–Cartagena railway in 1865, Albacete also became connected to the latter city.

Social inequality in the 19th century was rampant, with overwhelming rates of illiteracy in areas dwelled by day laborers. Meanwhile, the "middle class" consisted chiefly of civil servants and lawyers (thanks to hosting the seat of the Audiencia) as well a reduced number of merchants. Street electric lighting was inaugurated in 1888, thus being the first capital of a province in Spain with electric lighting in its streets.

Throughout the 19th century, the population of the town doubled from the 10,000 inhabitants at the beginning of the century to around 21,000 by the beginning of the 20th century. During this period, Albacete defended Queen Isabel II against the Carlists (the supporters of Charles, the pretender to the Spanish throne), supported Espartero and, just like other Spanish cities, constituted a revolutionary junta. During the long period of the Restoration (1875–1923), symptoms of caciquismo (the network of social relations based on clientelism underpinning the political life in the rural areas) became pervasive in the political and social life of Albacete.

Between 1900 and the end of the Spanish Civil War (1939), the population tripled. A number of basic public works date back to that time: the water supply and sewer system (1905), the Abelardo Sanchez Park (1910–23), Tesifonte Gallego Street and the industrial area of the town.

During the Spanish Civil War (1936–39), after a brief lapse in the power of the troops who had rebelled against the Republican government, the town fell back into the hands of Madrid. For most of the war, the airbase at Los Llanos was the main headquarters of the Republican air force. It was also the headquarters of the International Brigades (supporters of the Republican cause from other countries who fought in the Spanish Civil war) and a monument has been built recently to commemorate the sixty years' anniversary of those events. The first volume of Peter Weiss' novel The Aesthetics of Resistance is located in Albacete's Civil War days hospital "Cueva La Potita".

In the time of the transition to democracy, the two most significant events were the establishment in Albacete in 1982 of the High Court of Justice of Castilla–La Mancha, according to article 23 of the Statute of Autonomy of the Community. Casa de Quevedo, and the consolidation of the University, which brought new life to the town in 1985.

Geography

Location

The surrounding region, the so-called Mancha de Albacete stands out for its horizontality. The municipality lies to a large extent on an endorheic area, prone to water-logging after heavy rains. In that sense, the urban nucleus was in fact an endemic focus of malaria until the Royal Canal of Albacete was built.

The local soil is low in organic matter and at risk, although slight, of erosion.

Climate
Albacete has a cold semi-arid climate (Köppen: Bsk). Winters are cool while summers are hot. Winters and summers are usually dry. Because of the continental nature of the climate there is a large temperature variation during the year. Precipitation is low and mainly concentrated in spring and autumn usually falling in the form of rain, but there is occasional snow.

Government and administration

Justice administration 

The town is home to the High Court of Justice of Castile-La Mancha (TSJCLM), the highest court of the autonomous region. The president of the Superior Court is Vicente Manuel Rouco Rodríguez, which is the highest representative of judiciary to Castilla–La Mancha. The High Court, established in 1989, based on the Palace of Justice in Albacete, is divided into three rooms: the Chamber of Civil and Criminal, the Board of Administrative Litigation and the Room social.

The city also hosts the Institute of Legal Medicine of Albacete, Cuenca and Guadalajara, whose scope corresponds to homonymous provinces. Moreover, the Manchego capital is the seat of Bar Council of Castilla–La Mancha and Notary Association of Castilla–La Mancha.

The long legal tradition of Albacete goes back to 1834, when the Territorial Court of Albacete (predecessor of the High Court), which extended its jurisdiction over the provinces of Albacete was created Ciudad Real and Cuenca and the Murcia.

The city also has a Provincial Court and head judicial district of Albacete, the judicial No. 1 province, whose demarcation comprises the city and over 15 municipalities, mainly of metropolitan area, which adds a Dean.

The legal infrastructure is completed by two courts Administrative Litigation three trial courts, juvenile court, one for violence against women, three of Criminal Seven of First Instance, three social courts. In this sense we must bear in mind that the Autonomous Community of Castilla–La Mancha does not exercise the powers in justice. All courts of the city unless the Superior Court of Castilla–La Mancha will be based in the new City of Justice in Albacete.

In addition, on the outskirts of the city is the Albacete Prison, known as The Prison Torrecica, established in 1981, and the Center for Children Albaidel, born in 1993.

Demographics 

With 173,329 inhabitants as of 1 January 2019, according to data from the INE, Albacete is the most populous city in the autonomous community of Castilla–La Mancha, the city with the highest number of people in the South Submeseta after Madrid and one of the inner cities most populated Spain.

Demographic trends drawn historically sustained growth slowed somewhat in the 1950s, and very strong in recent years (+71% between 1970 and 2005, and 13% between 2000 and 2008). In 1999 there was segregation and subsequent emancipation of Pozo Cañada of the municipality of Albacete, establishing itself as an independent municipality.

Of the total 172  487 people surveyed in 2014, 10 851 were foreign nationals, representing 6.3% of the total. These immigrants come from all continents, the most numerous colonies of Romanian nationality (1 743), Bolivia (1 207), Morocco (1 074) and Colombia (974).

According to the Gazetteer of 2013, the municipality in addition to the capital city-the city of Albacete it includes a smaller local organization (Aguas Nuevas) and sixteen rural areas (The Salobral, Santa Ana, Bacariza, Argamasón, Tinajeros, Campillo of Doblas, The Anguijes, Abuzaderas, Cerrolobo, Casa de las Monjas, House Captain, Great House, Los Llanos, The Pulgosa, The Torrecica and Villar de Pozo Rubio).

For some years it is producing a demographic phenomenon around the city of Albacete, called Metropolitan area attraction which currently encompasses a population of 219 121 inhabitants between the city and nearby, and with strong growth stocks, whose projections for 2020 estimate that exceeds 300 000, because it is one of the areas with the highest growth projection and expansion throughout the southeast Spanish.

The metropolitan area of Albacete consists of Albacete and fourteen other near the capital municipalities: La Roda, Tarazona de la Mancha, Burrows, Chinchilla de Monte-Aragon, Pozo Cañada, La Gineta, Balazote, Barrax, Valdeganga, Mahora, Motilleja, Fuensanta, La Herrera and Montalvos.

The demonym used to describe the inhabitants of the town of Albacete is albaceteño, -ña or albacetense.

Economy 

Albacete is the premier economy of Castilla–La Mancha. The city currently bases its economy on the trade and services sector, being head of an extensive sales area of over 556,723 people from 154 municipalities scattered throughout the provinces of Albacete, Cuenca, Ciudad Real, Jaén, Alicante, Valencia and Murcia.

The city of Albacete has extensive industrial areas like the Business Park Campollano or Industrial Estate Romica, and also industrial estates in the Automotive (Ajusa Business Park), the Aeronautics and Logistics Park of Albacete and the Science and Technology Park. There are additionally several parks nearby towns in the metropolitan area.

Commercial activity is very important for the city and Albacete is the commercial capital of Castilla–La Mancha. 
Albacete has a long history as a city of business from the first half of the fourteenth century, partly through its agricultural and farming fair which became a meeting point for people of the southeast Spanish. Its geographical location and its good connections, coupled with the entrepreneurial character of its inhabitants have increased this capacity. It has a large and interesting exhibition calendar (Trade Fair of Albacete, IFAB) and a modern Congress Hall.

Education 

The city of Albacete facility has three universities, which offer a total of 41 different degrees:
 University of Castilla–La Mancha
 National University of Distance Education
 Ecclesiastical San Damaso University

Albacete hosts the Superior Conservatory of Music of Castilla–La Mancha, in which music is taught in degrees equivalent to university levels.

Health 

The public health system is managed by the regional Servicio de Salud de Castilla-La Mancha (SESCAM), which reports functionally to the health department of the Regional Government of Castile-La Mancha.

Military facilities 

The city of Albacete is first order concerning military and defense facilities, housing important institutions nationally and internationally as the Pilot School TLP NATO, Los Llanos Air Base, 14 Wing's or Air Arsenal Albacete, generating thousands of jobs directly and indirectly. Also, very close to it is situated the National Training Center Chinchilla, linked to the city.

School TLP NATO pilots 

The TLP (Tactical Leadership Programme officially) is an international center for advanced training for pilots and crews in order to improve the operability and effectiveness of Allied Air Forces. In addition to the workshops flight (both day and night), theoretical courses for staff of the three armies of both countries outside NATO and the Alliance has also developed, and assists in the development of air doctrine. It has a permanent staff of over 100 people of all member countries and their courses involve the deployment of 3,000 troops a year in the city. It has received an investment of over 32 million in recent years in infrastructure and equipment in Albacete.

Los Llanos Air Base 

The Los Llanos Air Base of Los Llanos is a major air bases in Spain, which is deployed Wing 14 and the most advanced aircraft of the Air Force, like the Eurofighter Typhoon, one of the most advanced fighter aircraft in the world. It is a small town where they work more than 1000 people.

Wing 14 
Wing 14 is one of the military units of the Air Force of Spain. Equipped with, among others, the Eurofighter Typhoon combat aircraft, whose main function is carrying out air missions. It has two squadrons: 141 Squadron and 142 Squadron.

Air Maestranza Albacete 
Albacete's Air Arsenal is the most important of Spain. Its mission is the maintenance of aircraft of the Air Force at the highest level. It has more than 600 workers.

Tourism and heritage

Architecture

Civil architecture 

Albacete civil architectural heritage include the works carried out at the end of 19th century and early 20th centuries, as its status as capital of the province and the arrival of the railroad marked a turning point in the demographic and urban growth of the city.

But there were already some important buildings of its kind in the city among which is the Posada del Rosario (16th century), typical Manchego mansion where Gothic, Mudejar and Renaissance styles meet, and today has become office Tourism and university library, Perona House (s. XVII) today headquarters of the Delegation of Regional Government of Castilla–La Mancha, the fairgrounds, opened in 1783, and becomes the capital of La Mancha the only city in Spain with an exhibition dedicated to this purpose, and has undergone several expansions.

In the nineteenth century there will be a need to provide the city of administrativos and cultural buildings, why after 1880 the Palace of the Provincial de Albacete, the Circus (1887) Theatre will be created, one of the few examples dedicated to such functions worldwide, or Marlo House Building.

The result of the strength of the bourgeoisie albacetense early twentieth century, Modernist architectural movement will be making their mark in the center of the capital, erecting buildings like the Casa del Hortelano, built in 1912 and now houses the Museum of Cutlery. From this period also dates the old City Hall, now the Municipal Museum of Albacete, built in 1902.

Gradually be raising the most emblematic buildings of the twentieth century as the Jubany Cabot House (1922), the Legorburo Building (1919), Hotel Regina (1919), Grand Hotel (1905), the flour mill (1916), the Building Sub Defense (1920), the building of the Red Cross (1921), BBVA Building (1920), the Chamber of Notaries (1925), the Fontecha chalet (1925), the College of Architects (1925), the Former Commissioner Simon Abril (1929), the Pious Schools of Albacete (1930), the Casino Primitivo (1927), the building of the Bank of Spain (1936), The Union Building and the Phoenix (1960), the Hotel Los Llanos (1969), the Palace of Justice in Albacete (1980), the Government Pavilion Building or José Prat (1993) or the Cultural Center Eixample (1995), but without doubt the most recognized work in the city early century Gabriel Lodares Passage, a shopping arcade linking the Mayor and Dye streets (built in 1925), designed by Buenaventura Ferrando Castell, and together with the Pasaje Gutierrez of Valladolid, are the only two remaining examples in Spain such galleries.

Other prominent buildings of the twentieth century are the Bancaja building, the Banesto building, the Casa de Doña Filomena Flores or Montecasino.

21st century buildings such as El Corte Ingles, the station Albacete-Los Llanos, the Congress Palace, the Hotel Beatriz, the European Centre for Business Innovation Albacete, Hotel Santa Isabel, the House of Culture José Saramago, Airport Terminal Albacete, the Informatics Research Institute, the Center for Entrepreneurship, the Multipurpose Building of the University of Castilla–La Mancha or the Commissioner of the National Police.

Religious architecture 

The city has numerous examples of religious architecture of different styles, such as Fatima Church, Monastery of the Incarnation, the Church of the Immaculate Conception, the Oratory of San Felipe Neri, the Church of St. Francis of Assisi, Cathedral San Juan, Church of Our Lady of Pilar, the Diocesan Seminary of Albacete, the Church of Santa Teresa, the Chapel of the Virgen de Los Llanos, the Church of the Assumption, the Retreat House of Albacete, the Church of St. Joseph, the Church of Piarists, the Holy Angel, the Ave Maria Church, the Church of St. Peter, the Church of the Resurrection of the Lord and the Church of Santo Domingo

Landmarks 

Most of the sights of Albacete are inside the center ring or first ring of the city, mainly surrounded by the Ring of Albacete and the Paseo de la Cuba and the Linear Park of Albacete. Altozano Square, located in downtown, is one of the most important hubs of Albacete. It contains many attractions of the capital of Albacete and the Municipal Museum, the Grand Hotel, the Jardines del Altozano, Altozano bomb shelters, the Justice Palace (seat of the High Court of Castilla–La Mancha) or Capitol Cinema. In this place they born five blocks.

The Marqués de Molins emblematic streets and Tesifonte Gallego, collectively known as Broad Street, leading from the Plaza del Altozano south of the city. In these remarkable places like the Chamber of Notaries, the Chalet Fontecha, the Cabot House, Building Banesto, Montecasino, the Legorburo Building, the BBVA building, the Casino Primitivo Albacete or Bancaja building, among others they are located. Broad Street intersects with numerous emblematic streets of the city center, as the street Conception, one of the main pillars in the area, the largest area of leave the city, comprising numerous streets and squares of the capital; Main Street, one of the most commercial and busy streets of Albacete, which ends in the historic square, where you can catch outstanding historic streets as street or tunnel Shoemakers Villacerrada; Tint or street, which are points of interest such as the Lodares Passage or the Posada del Rosario, Villacerrada way, and Tejares Street, the Plaza de San José and the Church of St. Joseph, road Carretas Square, towards the central neighborhood Carretas-Huerta March, where, among other places, are the Church of the Immaculate Conception, Deposits del Sol and the Plaza del Sol Deposits.

Broad Street ends at the Plaza de Gabriel Lodares, hangout emblematic as the Abelardo Sanchez Park, Palace Casa Marlo, Sanatorium Arturo Ortiz Cortes, MCC Building, Plaza de San José de Calasanz or major streets the city and the Paseo Simon Abril, Octavio Cuartero Street or Avenue of Spain, along which highlights as the Bachelor Institute Sabuco, the Civil Government (headquarters of the central government representation in Albacete), the hotel is located Los Llanos park fountain in the Plaza Benjamín Palencia, El Corte Ingles in Spain Avenue, the Estadio Carlos Belmonte or Campus Zone.

Abelardo Sanchez Park, the largest of Castilla–La Mancha, is the real heart of the city center. In it and in its vicinity are numerous tourist attractions of the capital as the Archaeological Museum of Albacete, the Oratory of San Felipe Neri, Plaza San Felipe Neri, leisure centers of the capital of Albacete, or the former Commissioner Simon April in addition to those located on the Avenue of Spain.

From the Plaza del Altozano, down the street Francisco Fontecha, accedes to the Constitution Square, presided over by the monument to Isabel of Portugal. West of the square of the Constitution is accessed via a staircase, the Virgin of Los Llanos Square in an old hill, chaired by the Triumph of the Virgin of Los Llanos and where the south façade of lies Cathedral of Albacete.

The streets Martinez Villena, San Julian and fair lead from the Plaza del Altozano west of the city, passing by places like the Plaza de la Catedral, in which are located the Cathedral of Albacete, the Town Hall, the Casa del Hortelano, home of the Museum of Cutlery in Albacete, or the Park of San Juan. In this regard places like the Monastery of the Incarnation, the Perona House, the Ateneo de Albacete, the Molino de la Feria, the Paseo de la Feria, one of the most important centers of the city, the park is situated Jardinillos, the Booth Jardinillos, the former Iron Gate of Albacete, the Plaza de Toros de Albacete, the suburbs of the Fair or the fairgrounds in Albacete, which are emblematic places like the Iron Gate, the PA Fair or the Chapel of the Virgen de Los Llanos. Later in this sense, outside the central area, other landmarks of the city such as Manchego Park Tree Festival or water tanks appear the Tree Festival.

The Paseo de la Libertad leads from the Place of the Hill to the north of the city. In the Paseo de la Libertad notable buildings such as the Provincial Palace Hotel Regina Albacete or lie. The route crosses the street Isaac Peral, where the Teatro Circo de Albacete is located. The Paseo de la Libertad ends at the Plaza of The Sower, which are landmarks such as The Sower, the Fountain of the Frogs, the Child Fuente de la Oca, the Linear Park and the Tower of the Ministry of Education. Throughout the Linear Park highlights as the flour mill, the locomotive Mikado Albacete, Paseo of the Planets or the wooden bridge they are located.

San Agustin street leading from the Plaza del Altozano east of the city. In this sense are places like the Palace of Justice, The Zone, bow tie or Cross Term.

Avenues Isabel the Catholic and Ramon Menéndez Pidal and its surroundings are one of the most important hubs of the city. These two consecutive avenues jointly host one of the most emblematic of La Mancha city boulevards. In other highlights this area as La Veleta, the Plaza de Isabel II, the square Tamos or marmosets are located.

Among the Abelardo Sanchez Park West and South Fairgrounds Albacete, in the downtown area, is the Eixample, one of the largest, populated and busiest commercial areas of the capital of Albacete. Eixample is home to many attractions of the city such as the church of Fatima (Fatima), the church of St. Francis of Assisi (on Franciscans, the most populous district of Albacete), cheap houses, the monumental housing market cheap, Pablo Picasso Square, the Holy Angel or the Cultural Center Eixample.

Outside the central area they include places like castizo and historic Santa Teresa, home to several important sites in the capital and the church of Santa Teresa, the Diocesan Seminary of Albacete and the Retreat House.

In Albacete is situated only active Germanic pagan temple in Europe. it is built and operated by Comunidad Odinista de Espana - Asatru.

Gardens, parks and natural environments 

Albacete is a city of Spain with a larger area of parkland.

Apart from squares, gardens and other parks scattered throughout the city, we must highlight the following parks:

 The Abelardo Sanchez Park is the largest urban park in Castilla–La Mancha. Popularly known as "The Park", it tends to be said is "lung" of the city. It has  extension in the center in the city.
 The Park Tree Festival. It houses the famous Water Reservoir Tree Festival, symbol of the city.
 The Linear Park, a long, wide promenade that crosses the city from northwest to southeast, along the old route of the railway which occupies  spread over three sections.
 The Park Jardinillos is one of the oldest in the capital. It is located in the Paseo de la Feria, housing the Booth Jardinillos, and has .
 The San Antón Polygon Park, established in 1980, is located northeast of the city.
 The Gardens of the Hill are the green area for the city's oldest man-made. 
 The Botanical Garden of Castilla–La Mancha in Avenida de La Mancha, a botanical garden 7 ha in size, with more than 1,500 species and 100,000 plants.
 Los Pinares del Júcar is located north of the city urban park, which is accessed through the AB-823 road.  in size, containing several playgrounds and entertainment.
Located on the road of the Rocks of San Pedro (CM-3203), has children's playgrounds, trails, sports facilities.
 The Greenway Pulgosa,  in length, connects the Avenida de La Mancha with The Pulgosa, the largest urban park of the city with 40 ha extension.
 The Bike path Albacete-Valdeganga,  in length, one of the longest bike lanes in Europe, connects the capital to Tinajeros and Valdeganga.

In addition, the city has an extensive network of trails and natural areas. In this regard highlights the natural path of Maria Cristina Canal, that following enlargement in its different phases currently has . With regard to the most important natural areas they are:

 The oaks of the road Mahora 231 ha.
 Actual Glen Pozo Rubio with 35.90 ha.
 The banks of the Júcar River which has four sites; Groundhog with 85.53 ha, has twisted of 23.06, 54.47 Cuasiermas that has been, and The Mariquilla with 80.34 hectares.

Culture and art

Museums and galleries 

 Museums
 The Archaeological Museum of Albacete, located in the Abelardo Sanchez Park, contains an extensive collection of archaeological sites throughout the province, from the Paleolithic through Middle Ages as well as an important collection of the painter Benjamin Palencia.
 The Pedagogical Museum and Children of Castilla–La Mancha preserves and exhibits related to the history of education and childhood in Castilla–La Mancha materials. It is the only national museum covering all forms of life and culture of the children. Your funds are exposed in four permanent exhibition halls (school, recreation, home and the world of dreams) plus other units dedicated to the Documentation Center and Archive.
 The Municipal Museum of Albacete is located in the building occupied by the City of Albacete until 1986 in the Place of the Hill. The current museum was opened in 1995. It houses various temporary exhibitions, mainly of fine arts and exhibitions on the city.
 The Museum of Cutlery Albacete in Cathedral Square, located in the Casa del Hortelano, houses an extensive collection of traditional and recognized Cutlery Albacete, plus temporary exhibitions on cutlery worldwide. It is one of only three museums of Europe on the cutlery.
 The Interpretation Center of Peace or Peace Museum is located in the bomb shelters of the Hill of Civil War located in Place Altozano. The center caters to the exhibition and dynamic information from the action of peace.
 The Botanical Garden of Castilla–La Mancha is a living museum of the plant world 7 hectares which houses more than 1 500 species and 100 000 plants.
 The International Folk Art Museum World. It is made up of more than 10,000 pieces from the five continents.
 The Fire Museum of Albacete shows the history of the firefighter s in the fight against fire. It includes commemorative helmet 11 S loan from Fire Station New York.
 The Police Museum Albacete takes a journey through the symbols, clothing, weapons and vehicles that are part of the history of Police.

 Exhibit space

The city also has many exhibition halls and cultural centers trying different cultural aspects, such as the Caja Castilla–La Mancha Cultural Centre, the Exhibition Hall of the Official College of Architects and Quantity Surveyors Albacete, the Alusearte, the Assumption Cultural Center, Gallery Art Gallery Magnus, the Exhibition Hall ACDA, the House of Culture José Saramago or Center Cultural Eixample.

Theatres 

The city of Albacete has many scenic areas, among them:

 The Albacete Circus Theater, opened in 1887 in mudejar style, which still maintains a two-stage capacity (theater and circus), making it unique in Spain and one of the six theaters circuses the existing nineteenth century in the world (most notably the Coliseum Two Recreios of Lisbon (Portugal), the Cirque D'Hiver of Paris (France) or the Bolshoi Theatre of Moscow (Russia) has 895 seats altogether.
 The Teatro de la Paz. Has 645 seats, offering a varied program throughout the year
 The Candilejas Theatre, located in the heart of Albacete, independent programming commitment.
 The Auditorium Albacete, where they usually perform musical activities (concerts, dance, etc.) and theatrical performances, and has a total capacity of 560 people, and where pictorial and photographic exhibitions are also held.
 The Booth Jardinillos is a multi-purpose outdoor enclosure designed to accommodate all types of events, shows and concerts located in the Paseo de la Feria. It has capacity for 6300 spectators.
 The Albacete Congress Palace, opened in 2007, has capacity for about 2,000 people and hosts all kinds of events.

Festivities

Albacete Fair 

From 7 to 17 September, the Fair Albacete takes place. It is the "biggest party" in the Albacete calendar. In 2010, the third anniversary of the declaration of free fair was held by Felipe V, although it several centuries ago and celebrated is held in honor of the patron saint of the city, the Virgin of Los Llanos, and is accompanied by one of the most important bullfights calendar national.

The 7th begins in the afternoon with the Parade Albacete Fair, a parade of floats from the Plaza de Gabriel Lodares through Iron Gate of Fairground, after which the opening of the same takes place. Since then, and for ten days, they are held numerous recreational, cultural and sports activities throughout the city, but especially concentrated around Paseo de la Feria, the Fairground and surroundings (so-called string), where attractions of all types and booths of all associations are based.

Feast of San Juan 

In the days before 24 June, the feast of John the Baptist pattern of Albacete, the festival is held in his honor. These are accompanied by cultural, sporting and leisure activities in various parts of the city.

The highlight of the festivities take place on 24 June and yesterday, the Midsummer (23–24 June). That night is held torchlight parade from City Hall to the Ejidos Fair, where catches fire in the Bonfire of San Juan, where old belongings and burn stuff. Then a big castle fireworks and a festival in the Fairground is performed.

Finally, on 24 it carries out a pilgrimage in which he moved to San Juan from the cathedral to the Park Tree Festival.

Easter 

Between Palm Sunday and Easter Sunday is held in Albacete Easter, in which the various brotherhoods in processions through the city, accompanied by the steps and the touch of bugles and drums.

Year after year, the Albacete Easter has gained more prestige, having been classified as Regional Tourist interest. The best processions are held: on Holy Thursday at 12 pm (Procession of Silence) and “Holy” Burial are held on Friday.

Carnival 
The day before the hash Wednesday Thursday celebrates the Day Mona, where traditionally families will eat the mona to Park the Tree Festival or suburban park of The Pulgosa, where children's activities are also held.

The weekend before Ash Wednesday (beginning of Lent) is celebrated on Carnival, with costume parades and contests jokes.

Finally, Ash Wednesday is celebrated Burial of the Sardine, in which a fault shaped sardine (Doña Sardina) is transferred with mourners from the Plaza de Gabriel Lodares to Place of the Hill, where he is tried, convicted and burned.

Other celebrations 
 In Christmas Albacete streets are decorated with lights and ornaments to celebrate the holidays. On 5 January arrival and Cavalcade of the Magi takes place, accompanying the Kings through the streets of the city, from the Asylum of San Anton to the town hall.
 On 17 January, the day of San Antonio Abad, is celebrated San Anton, with the traditional blessing of the animals by the bishop in the Asylum of San Anton. Typically buy some dates and snack churros.
 It is customary in Albacete sing Mayos and Plaza Virgen de Los Llanos at midnight on 30 April to 1 May.
 More and more intensely celebrated the feast of Halloween night 31 October, where parties are common costume or the typical pumpkin s fired.
 In recent years they have spread throughout the city neighborhoods parties.

Bullfighting 

Bullfighting is deeply rooted in the city of Albacete. Among other issues, the livestock sector has enough presence in the province, where farms are important such as Samuel Flores, Las Ramblas, El Pizarral, Los Chospes, Sonia Gonzalez or Ruiz Yagüe.

The city has a school of bullfighting, the Bullfighting School of Albacete, where some of the bullfighters of the future are trained, and an important Albacete Bullring, second administrative category (although bullfighting events are held here more often than most first bullrings), with a capacity of 12 000 spectators, where the main shows held during 'Bullfighting Albacete' in the month of September. This brings together for ten days leading figures in the bullfighting world, with a significant presence of Castilian-La Mancha bullfighters. Given its large bullfighting tradition, Albacete in 2015 he hosted the First International Congress of bullfighting.

The city also hosts the celebration every year of heifers and traditional Corrida de Asprona, to benefit the Association for the Care of Persons with Intellectual Disabilities and their Families in the Province of Albacete, in which top bullfighters participate.

Meanwhile, in the city of Albacete were born some great bullfighters like Dámaso González, or more currently Manuel Amador, Manuel Caballero and Miguel Tendero.

Crafts 

Albacete craftsmanship is closely linked to the knife since the fifteenth century, and features a wide variety of ways that relate to their specific use. The typical Albacete knife has a spring mechanism or ratchet that differentiates it from the rest. The passing of time has shaped and diversified manufacturing the same, leading to the production of scissors, knives, daggers and scalpels for medicine.

Currently the knife industry has modernized and moved largely to the industrial areas of the city, competing with the Asian market. From the union between Albacete and cutlery is the saying that "the knife from Albacete not give away, the friend sold at a symbolic price, so do not cut friendship". The history of Albacete cutlery can be visited at the Museum of Cutlery. Craft fairs as the Craft Fair of Castilla–La Mancha or Artisan Cutlery Albacete Fair are held annually in the capital of Albacete.

Cuisine 

While traditional Spanish cuisine is fused with Levantine and Mancha influences, Albacete cuisine is rich and varied.

It stresses the dish of Gazpachos Mancha with game meat, the breadcrumbs ruleras, pastor porridge (with fresh bacon and pebbles or millet flour), the manchego ratatouille or wet during the summer time, combining tomato and pepper, beans with partridge or popular atascaburras whose base is the egg, oil and cod, and which dates back to lous cold winters La Mancha Albacete, as well as the garlic mataero. Albacete cuisine is based on the finest ingredients such as meat manchego lamb (which has a PGI) and the manchego cheese (that is name of protected source) or wines (DO La Mancha, DO Almansa, OJ Manchela), whose derivatives create delight diners as crook, the zurracapote, the Marc or dove.

As for desserts, the most important is the miguelitos La Roda, flowers and chips, made from flour, eggs, sunflower oil, sugar, dry anise and rosemary honey, which derives dessert Albacete phrase that when all goes well "as is hunky-dory," must buns, sighs...

Symbols
Arms

According to a resolution adopted by the Plenary Council, in a session held on 28 February 1986, the shield of Albacete is described as follows: "The city of Albacete has as its shield: three towers neatly arranged on a silver background with battlements, of stone, saber embroidered in azure, clarified and surmounted by a saber-bat with outstretched wings positioned at the top. It is stamped with a Marquis crown, which is gold with stones and pearls, with eight rosettes (four numbered and the other in pyramids of three pearls, one is visible with two halves of the first kind and intercroppings of the second two)."

But the agreement contained a typo, and saying "three towers well ordered" in heraldry would mean two towers above and one below, or one above and two below. Instead, the descriptions should read "three towers wrongly ordered."

Later the Official Journal of Castilla–La Mancha published on 13 January 1987 Decree 137/86 of 30 December, from the Presidency and Government of the Community Board, which approved the amendment of the Heraldic Shield of the City of Albacete, without making corrections to the description of the ordering of the towers.

Flag

According to the resolution adopted by the City Council plenary in a session dated 30 April 1992, the City Council acknowledged the Order of the Ministry of Public Administration, dated 9 March of that year, through which the municipality of Albacete was granted a flag, with the following description:

"crimson red canvas, dimensions  with the Albacete Shield encamped in the center, according to the amendment by Decree 137/86 of 30 December.

Anthem
The anthem was launched on 8 September 1926, day of the Virgin of Los Llanos (patron saint of the city), in what was referred to as the "Provincial Anthem feast", which took place at the Plaza de Toros in the Albacete capital. The Municipal Band of Albacete and Spanish Infantry Regiment, among others, performed at this event.

On the night of San Juan in 1975 (day of the patron of the city), the song was re-released at the Teatro Circo de Albacete by the Albacete Municipal Band and the La Mancha Choir, becoming a hallmark of the capital.

Transport

Road network 
Its strategic location midway between the center of the peninsula, near Levante and Andalusia, makes the city is erected as one of the most important communications hubs southeast Spanish, with motorways to Madrid, Valencia, Alicante, Toledo, Ciudad Real and Murcia (in a few years also Jaen, and Teruel via Cuenca).

City buses 
The city has 10 lines of bus urban (7 of them daily). The buses have a red and white corporate color. Albacete capital currently has 28 vehicles. One of the buses is the model "Labobús", i.e. a modern vehicle with data storage and powered by solar panels. The stop frequency time is 11 minutes a day most lines. The extensive municipality of Albacete has regular bus lines that connect the city from the bus terminal, with major centers.

Intercity buses 
The Bus Station Albacete, managed by EMISALBA (Municipal Infrastructure and Services Albacete SA), is located in the northwest of the city, it has  (parking included). From the terminal, Albacete has connections through regular intercity bus lines to cities of Valencia, Murcia, Madrid, Catalonia, Andalusia, Extremadura, besides having connections with the major cities of Castilla–La Mancha and municipalities throughout the Albacete.

Railway 
The Albacete-Los Llanos railway station is located on the street Federico García Lorca, very close to the A-31. Inaugurated in 2010, it has extensive shopping and leisure. From the new station ADIF the capital has a wide range of provincial, regional and national connections.

Aviation 
Its facilities are very close to the Los Llanos Air Base of Air Force, the Air Arsenal and Air and Logistic Park.

Bicycle 

Sport 

The most successful football club in the city is the Albacete Balompié, who plays Segunda Division after playing in Primera Division. In women's football highlights Fundación Albacete, who plays Primera Division.

The city hosts every year the Circuito de Albacete, important evidence as the International FIM CEV Championship. Throughout its history, the Albacete track has hosted events like the World Superbike Championship, the World Endurance Championship, the European Championship Motorcycling or FIA European Truck Racing Championship, among many others. On the Circuito de Albacete have passed and legends from the world of motor as Michael Schumacher, Sebastian Vettel, Fernando Alonso, Valentino Rossi, Jorge Lorenzo, Marc Marquez or Dani Pedrosa.

The Estadio Carlos Belmonte Albacete has hosted five matches to date of the Spain national football team. Albacete has also been the scene of the Davis Cup. The Tour of Spain has had as output or goal to the city of Albacete 42 times. Another classic of the city is the International Half Marathon City of Albacete, held in the month of May for a street circuit that runs through the streets of the capital. On 31 December the city dismisses the year with traditional and crowded Carrera de San Silvestre, which highlights the costumes of the athletes.

The city has other major sporting and entertainment venues such as the Albacete Tennis Club or the Club of Golf Las Pinaillas, designed by legendary golfer Severiano Ballesteros.

International relations

Twin towns–Sister cities
Albacete has reached sister city–twin town agreements with:
 San Carlos, Nicaragua (1992).
 Dahira Bir Ganduz Sahrawi refugee camp, Algeria (1994).
 Vienne, France (1995).
 Reconquista, Argentina (1997).
 La Lisa, Cuba (2002).
 Houndé, Burkina Faso (2008).
 Nanchang, China (2012).
 Udine, Italy.

See also
 List of municipalities in Albacete

References
Citations

Bibliography

External links

 Ayuntamiento de Albacete

 
Municipalities of the Province of Albacete